Lettsom is a surname. Notable people with the surname include: 

John Coakley Lettsom (1744–1815), English physician and philanthropist 
William Garrow Lettsom (1805–1887), British diplomat, mineralogist and spectroscopist
William Nanson Lettsom (1796–1865), English man of letters